Craig S. Harris (born September 10, 1953) is an American jazz trombonist, who started working with Sun Ra in 1976. He also has worked with Abdullah Ibrahim, David Murray, Lester Bowie, Cecil Taylor, Sam Rivers, Muhal Richard Abrams, and Charlie Haden. He has recorded since 1983 as leader for India Navigation, Soul Note and JMT. For the latter he recorded with two groups. The Tailgater's Tales was a quintet with clarinetist Don Byron, trumpeter Eddie Allen, Anthony Cox on double bass, and Pheeroan akLaff on drums. His large ensemble Cold Sweat was a tribute to the music of James Brown.

He is a graduate of the music program of State University of New York at Old Westbury, and was influenced by its founder and director Makanda Ken McIntyre. Harris's move to New York City in 1978 established him with trombonists Ray Anderson, Joseph Bowie, and George E. Lewis.

He first played alongside another of his teachers at SUNY, baritone saxophonist Pat Patrick, in Sun Ra's Arkestra for two years. Harris than embarked on a world tour with South African pianist Abdullah Ibrahim (Dollar Brand) in 1981. While on tour in Australia, Harris discovered the indigenous Australian wind instrument the didgeridoo, which he added to the collection of instruments he plays.

Discography

As leader 
 Aboriginal Affairs (India Navigation, 1983)
 Black Bone (Soul Note, 1984)
 Tributes (OTC, 1985)
 Shelter (JMT, 1987)
 Blackout in the Square Root of Soul (JMT, 1988)
 Cold Sweat Plays J. B. (JMT, 1989)
 4 Play (JMT, 1990)
 F-Stops (Soul Note, 1994)
 Istanbul (Doublemoon, 1998)
 Souls Within the Veil (Aquastra Music, 2005)

As sideman
With Muhal Richard Abrams
 Blues Forever (Black Saint, 1982)
 Rejoicing with the Light (Black Saint, 1983)
 Song for All (Black Saint, 1997)

With David Murray
 Murray's Steps (Black Saint, 1983)
 Live at Sweet Basil Volume 1 (Black Saint, 1985)
 Live at Sweet Basil Volume 2 (Black Saint, 1985)
 New Life (Black Saint, 1987)
 David Murray Big Band (DIW, 1991)
 Hope Scope (Black Saint, 1991)
 Picasso (DIW, 1993)
 South of the Border (DIW, 1995)
 Dark Star: The Music of the Grateful Dead  (Astor Place, 1996)
 Fo Deuk Revue (Enja, 1997)
 Octet Plays Trane (Justin Time, 2000)
 Yonn-Dé (Justin Time, 2002)
 Now Is Another Time (Justin Time, 2003)
 Perfection with Geri Allen and Terri Lyne Carrington (Motema, 2016)
 Blues for Memo (Motema, 2018)

With Sun Ra
 Live at Montreux (Saturn Research, 1976)
 Cosmos (Cobra, 1976)
 Unity (Horo, 1978)
 Sleeping Beauty (El Saturn, 1979)
 Strange Celestial Road (Rounder, 1980)
 A Quiet Place in the Universe (Leo, 1994)

With others
 Ahmed Abdullah, Traveling the Spaceways (Planet Arts, 2004)
 Ayibobo, Freestyle (DIW, 1993)
 Billy Bang, Hip Hop Be Bop (ITM, 1993)
 Lester Bowie, I Only Have Eyes for You (ECM, 1985)
 Dollar Brand, African Marketplace (Elektra, 1980)
 Dollar Brand, At Montreux (Enja, 1980)
 Don Byron, Bug Music (Nonesuch, 1996)
 Carla Cook, Dem Bones (Maxjazz, 2001)
 Paulinho da Costa, Sunrise (Victor, 1984)
 Joseph Daley, The Seven Deadly Sins (Jaro, 2010)
 Lena Horne, Lena Horne: The Lady and Her Music (Qwest, 1981)
 Joseph Jarman, Earth Passage - Density  (Black Saint, 1981)
 The Roots, The Roots Come Alive (MCA, 1999)
 Sekou Sundiata, LongStoryShort (Righteous Babe, 2000)
 Warren Smith, Dragon Dave Meets Prince Black Knight from the Darkside of the Moon (Porter, 2011)
 Henry Threadgill, When Was That? (About Time, 1982)
 Henry Threadgill, Just the Facts and Pass the Bucket (About Time, 1983)
 World Saxophone Quartet, Experience (Justin Time, 2004)
 World Saxophone Quartet, Political Blues (Justin Time, 2006)

References 

American jazz composers
American jazz trombonists
Male trombonists
Avant-garde jazz musicians
Free jazz trombonists
People from Hempstead (village), New York
1953 births
Living people
India Navigation artists
State University of New York at Old Westbury alumni
Jazz musicians from New York (state)
21st-century trombonists
American male jazz composers
21st-century American male musicians
JMT Records artists
Black Saint/Soul Note artists